College View is a rural locality in the Lockyer Valley Region, Queensland, Australia. In the  College View had a population of 84 people.

History
The locality takes its name from the former Queensland Agricultural College (now the University of Queensland Gatton Campus) in neighbouring Lawes.

On 28 August 1900, a public meeting was held to obtain a school in the district as there was an estimated 30 children who would attend. The Queensland Agricultural College offered  of its land (although this was subsequently increased as the Queensland Government thought more land was required for a school). College View Provisional School opened on 26 August 1901 with Miss Lewis as headteacher. On 1 January 1909 it became College View State School. The school closed in 1958.

In the  College View had a population of 84 people.

References 

Lockyer Valley Region
Localities in Queensland